The Botanischer Sondergarten Wandsbek (1.5 hectares) is a municipal botanical garden located in the Eichtalpark, Wandsbek, at Walddörferstraße 273, Hamburg, Germany. The garden began in 1926 as a school garden and became a municipal garden in 1956. It is open daily without charge.

See also 
 List of botanical gardens in Germany

External links 

 Botanischer Sondergarten Wandsbek
 Plants and more description
 Qype entry

Buildings and structures in Wandsbek
Wandsbek, Botanischer Sondergarten
Wandsbek, Botanischer Sondergarten
Education in Hamburg